The Northern Colorado Bears men's basketball team is the basketball team that represents University of Northern Colorado (UNC) in Greeley, Colorado, United States.  The school's team currently competes in the Big Sky Conference.

Postseason history

NCAA Division I tournament results
The Bears have appeared in the NCAA Division I Tournament once, where they lost to San Diego State in 2011 (led by coach B. J. Hill).

NCAA Division II tournament results
The Bears have appeared in the NCAA Division II Tournament four times. Their combined record is 1–6.

CBI results
The Bears have appeared in one College Basketball Invitational (CBI). Their combined record is 2–1.

CIT results
The Bears have appeared in the CollegeInsider.com Postseason Tournament (CIT) three times under three different head coaches (Tad Boyle, B. J. Hill, Jeff Linder). Their combined record is 5–2. They were CIT champions in 2018.

References

External links